Hirtomurex squamosus is a species of sea snail, a marine gastropod mollusk in the family Muricidae, the murex snails or rock snails.

List of synonyms
 Coralliophila alucoides (Blainville, 1829)
 Coralliophila alucoides curta Settepassi, 1977 (not available, published in a work which does not consistently use binomial nomenclature (ICZN art. 11.4))
 Coralliophila alucoides depressa Settepassi, 1977 (not available, published in a work which does not consistently use binomial nomenclature (ICZN art. 11.4))
 Coralliophila alucoides modesta Settepassi, 1977 (not available, published in a work which does not consistently use binomial nomenclature (ICZN art. 11.4))
 Coralliophila alucoides squamulata Settepassi, 1977 (not available, published in a work which does not consistently use binomial nomenclature (ICZN art. 11.4))
 Coralliophila lamellosa (Philippi, 1836)
 Coralliophila lamellosa elongata Settepassi, 1977 (not available, published in a work which does not consistently use binomial nomenclature (ICZN art. 11.4))
 Coralliophila lamellosa inflata Settepassi, 1977 (not available, published in a work which does not consistently use binomial nomenclature (ICZN art. 11.4))
 Coralliophila squamosa (Bivona Ant. in Bivona And., 1838)
 Coralliophila turris Settepassi, 1977 (not available, published in a work which does not consistently use binomial nomenclature (ICZN art. 11.4))
 Fusus craticulatus var. pianosana Sturany, 1896 
 Fusus lamellosus Philippi, 1836 ex de Cristofori and Jan ms
 Fusus squamosus Bivona Ant. in Bivona And., 1838
 Fusus squamulosus Philippi, 1836
 Murex alucoides Blainville, 1829
 Ocinebrina ruderata pianosana Settepassi, 1977 (not available, published in a work which does not consistently use binomial nomenclature (ICZN art. 11.4))
 ? Pseudomurex monterosatoi Locard, 1897
 ? Pseudomurex perfectus Fischer P., 1883
 ? Pseudomurex ruderatus Sturany, 1896 ex Monterosato ms.

Description

Distribution
This species occurs in the North Atlantic Ocean, in the Mediterranean Sea off Greece and Corsica; in the Caribbean Sea and in the Gulf of Mexico.

References

 Settepassi F. (1977). Atlante Malacologico. I molluschi marini viventi nel Mediterraneo, volume II. 304 pp. Museo di Zoologia, Roma
 Oliverio M. (2008) Coralliophilinae (Neogastropoda: Muricidae) from the southwest Pacific. In: V. Héros, R.H. Cowie & P. Bouchet (eds), Tropical Deep-Sea Benthos 25. Mémoires du Muséum National d'Histoire Naturelle 196: 481–585.
 Landau B.M., Merle D., Ceulemans L. & Van Dingenen F. (2019). The upper Miocene gastropods of northwestern France, 3. Muricidae. Cainozoic Research. 19(1): 3-44.

External links
  Bivona-Bernardi And. (1838). Generi et specie di molluschi descritti dal Barone Antonio Bivona e Bernardi. Lavori postumi pubblicati dal figlio Andrea dottore in medicina con note ed aggiunte. Giornale di Scienze Lettere e Arti per la Sicilia. 61: 211-227 [stated date March 1838; 63: 319-324 [stated date September 1838] [also as reprint, 16 pp, 1 pl., tipografia del Giornale Letterario, Palermo ]
 Blainville H.M.D. de. (1828-1830). Malacozoaires ou Animaux Mollusques. [in Faune Française. Levrault, Paris 320 p., 48 pl. ]
 Sturany, R. (1896). Zoologische Ergebnisse VII. Mollusken I (Prosobranchier und Opisthobranchier; Scaphopoden; Lamellibranchier) gesammelt von S.M. Schiff "Pola" 1890-1894. Denkschriften der Kaiserlichen Akademie der Wissenschaften, Mathematische-Naturwissenschaftlischen Classe. 63: 1-36, pl. 1-2
 Fischer P. (1882-1883). Diagnoses d'espèces nouvelles de mollusques recueillis dans le cours des expéditions scientifiques de l'aviso "Le Travailleur" (1880 et 1881). Journal de Conchyliologie 30: 49-53 [1882, 273-277]

Hirtomurex
Gastropods described in 1838